#1 to Infinity is the sixth greatest hits album by American singer-songwriter and producer Mariah Carey. It was released by Sony Music Entertainment on May 15, 2015. It features Carey's then eighteen US number-one singles on the Billboard Hot 100. A new recording called "Infinity" was released as the only single on April 27, 2015. In January 2015, the singer announced that she had signed a residency deal to perform at The Colosseum at the Caesars Palace hotel in Las Vegas in May and July 2015, (later extended into 2016 and 2017) and would perform all of her number ones. As a result, she decided to re-release her first compilation, 1998's #1's, with an updated list of subsequent chart toppers. Carey promoted the album with her #1 to Infinity residency and with live performances at the  Billboard Music Awards, Jimmy Kimmel Live! and Live! with Kelly and Michael.

Background 
Following the release of Mariah Carey's fourteenth studio album, Me. I Am Mariah… The Elusive Chanteuse, in May 2014, she parted ways with her record label Def Jam Recordings, her publicist Cindi Berger and her manager Jermaine Dupri. She signed a new record contract with L.A. Reid at Epic Records (who co-executively produced Carey's tenth album The Emancipation of Mimi in 2005), sought a new publicist with Chris Chambers of the Chamber Group and hired new managers Stella Bulochnikov and Brian Sher. Writers Shirley Halperin and Andrew Hampp of Billboard attributed Carey's decision to seek a new label and management to the low sales of Me. I Am Mariah… The Elusive Chanteuse, which at a total of 117,000 units since its release, is Carey's lowest selling album in the United States. Carey secured a multi-album record deal with Epic in January 2015, a subsidiary of Sony Music Entertainment, meaning that #1 to Infinity would be her first album since her seventh studio album Rainbow in 1999 to be released with Sony.

Following the release of Rainbow, Carey left Sony and signed an $80 million, four-album contract with EMI's Virgin Records, wishing to sever all ties with Sony and its chairman, her former husband Tommy Mottola. Halperin and Hampp believe that following a prolonged period of absence from Sony and re-signing with them is a positive situation for Carey: "Doug Morris, current chairman/CEO of Sony Music, brought Carey to Island Def Jam in 2003 when he was running Universal Music Group. Reid, then head of Island Def Jam, oversaw her Mimi-powered 2005 comeback. Joey Arbagey, a collaborator of Carey's during the making of the six-times platinum The Emancipation of Mimi, is now executive vp A&R at Epic." Furthermore, Carey released seven studio albums, a live EP and four compilation/greatest hits albums with Sony, which have sold a total of 54 million units in the US combined. Although Halperin and Hampp note that "Carey's legacy is undisputed, her recent stumbles have not gone unnoticed," with regard to her divorce from Nick Cannon, the low sales of Me. I Am Mariah… The Elusive Chanteuse and its failure to garner a top-ten single on the Billboard Hot 100 and hiring and firing three managers: Dupri, Randy Jackson and Kevin Giles (the last of whom Carey has kept as a consultant). As a result, several record labels were reluctant to offer Carey a contract. According to Billboard, many other critics felt that reuniting with Reid is Carey's best chance of re-establishing herself on the charts.

Content 
In January 2015, Carey announced that she would re-release #1's (1998) with an updated version featuring her songs that had in the meantime reached number one: "Heartbreaker" featuring Jay-Z (1999), "Thank God I Found You" featuring Joe and 98 Degrees (2000), "We Belong Together" (2005), "Don't Forget About Us" (2005/06) and "Touch My Body" (2008). The North American track listing of #1 to Infinity features Carey's then eighteen US number-one singles on the Billboard Hot 100 and one new recording called "Infinity". Instead of including the original studio version of her third number one "Someday" (1991), the live recording from her MTV Unplugged EP (1992) features instead. Carey explains in the liner notes of #1 to Infinity that she felt the studio version was overproduced. The Bad Boy Fantasy remix of her ninth number one "Fantasy" featuring Ol' Dirty Bastard was included instead of the original solo version. Carey describes the remix as a "turning point" in her career.

"Someday",  "I Don't Wanna Cry" and "Thank God I Found You" were omitted from the international track listing. They were replaced with Carey's cover of Badfinger's song "Without You" (number one in New Zealand, the United Kingdom, and several European territories), her "Endless Love" duet with Luther Vandross (number one in New Zealand) and "Against All Odds" featuring Westlife (number one in the United Kingdom). "Thank God I Found You" was also omitted from the Japanese track listing, and replaced with "All I Want for Christmas Is You", which remains her best-selling single in the country. For the album artwork, Carey launched a social media campaign on April 12, 2015, whereby fans had to share a link to her website in order to reveal the cover which was concealed by a curtain. Using the hashtag "RevealMariah", the more shares the link received, the quicker the cover was revealed. Fans unlocked the final image a day later on April 13.

Singles 
"Infinity" was released as the only single from the album, and was the only new recording to be included on the track list. It is a mid-tempo R&B song written by Carey, Eric Hudson, Priscilla Renea, Taylor Parks and Ilsey Juber. Lyrically, the song is about Carey freeing herself and emancipation, however many critics speculated that the lyrics were specifically about her separation from her second husband, Nick Cannon. In response, Carey said that the song was not a reflection of her personal life, but even if it was, she would not publicly confirm who it was written about. Critical response to the song was positive, with many critics praising Carey's vocals and her comical songwriting, specifically with regard to the reference about Fritos. "Infinity" reached number 82 on the Billboard Hot 100, becoming her forty-seventh entry since her debut in 1990.

Promotion 

On January 15, 2015, Carey appeared on The Ellen DeGeneres Show to announce that she signed a contract to take up residency at The Colosseum at the Caesars Palace hotel in Las Vegas in May and July 2015; it is called #1 to Infinity. During the interview, Carey confirmed "I'm going to do my first ever residency in Vegas at Caesars." "This is a special event for me. And again, I have to hope that the fans will enjoy this cause I'm gonna be performing, which was kind of inspired by my album #1's, and this is now the updated version with eighteen of them. Hopefully other people will enjoy this. I've never done this before." The confirmation of Carey's residency came after Canadian megastar Celine Dion announced that she had postponed dates of her residency at Caesars Palace to care for her husband, René Angélil, who was suffering from cancer. Aside from singing "Infinity" at her residency, Carey performed a medley of her 1990 debut single "Vision of Love" followed by "Infinity" at the Billboard Music Awards on May 17, 2015; it was her first performance at the ceremony in seventeen years. Andrew Hampp for Billboard described the performance as "octave-leaping" and one of the most memorable of the night. Other promotional appearances included Jimmy Kimmel Live! and Live! with Kelly and Michael. For the latter, Carey wore an Aurora-inspired dress from the Disney film Sleeping Beauty and performed on Main Street, U.S.A. in Disney World.

Reception 
Jamieson Cox, from Time, wrote that "if you needed a reminder of just how thoroughly Mariah Carey dominated the 90s, or a refresher on the staggering force of the numbers she’s put up throughout her career, #1 To Infinity will do just fine", but also pointing out that most of the songs were released from 1990 to 1995, just 20% of Carey's entire recording career, as well as criticizing the lack of material released from 2005 onwards; "in 2015, we're as far away from 'We Belong Together' as that song was from 'Fantasy', and that lost decade is the root of this compilation’s greatest tragedy [...] the great majority of the fine work Carey’s done in the last decade might as well not exist". Nonetheless, he praised the compilation for highlighting "the sheer athleticism and skill that propelled Carey’s early work. She took very simple songs—both in terms of arrangements and theme—rooted in pop, gospel, and R&B and turned them into feats of strength, granting them dynamism and drama with a voice that juggled power, clarity, and agility with ease".

Commercial performance 
#1 to Infinity debuted at number 29 on the US Billboard 200 chart on June 6, 2015, selling 15,000 copies in its first week, marking the ninth highest debut of the week and the twentieth best-selling album of the week. It became her twentieth album to make the chart. Her eponymous album had debuted at number 80 twenty-five years prior in 1990 and later became her first of six number-one albums in 1991. #1 to Infinity peaked at number 2 on the Top R&B/Hip-Hop Albums chart and R&B Albums chart, respectively. As of November 2018, the album has sold 86,000 copies in the United States. In the United Kingdom, the album debuted at number 8 on May 24, 2015, remaining on the chart for 5 weeks. On the UK R&B Albums Chart, the compilation reached number 1. Similarly, the album peaked at number 18 on the Australian Albums Chart, but reached number 2 on the Urban Albums Chart.

Track listing 

Notes
 "Someday" is included as the live performance version from MTV Unplugged in place of the original studio recording
 "I'll Be There" featuring Trey Lorenz is a cover, originally performed by The Jackson 5
 "Without You" is a cover, originally performed by Badfinger
 "Endless Love" with Luther Vandross is a cover, originally performed by Lionel Richie and Diana Ross
 "Against All Odds" with Westlife is a cover, originally performed by Phil Collins

Sample credits
 "Fantasy"(Bad Boy Fantasy Remix) contains a sample of the Tom Tom Club's song "Genius of Love", written by Chris Frantz, Tina Weymouth, Adrian Belew and Steven Stanley
 "Honey" contains samples of "Hey DJ" performed by The World's Famous Supreme Team, written by Stephen Hague, and "The Body Rock" performed by the Treacherous Three, written by Bobby Robinson, Larry Price and Malcolm McLaren
 "Heartbreaker" contains a sample of "Attack of the Name Game" performed by Stacy Lattisaw, written by Shirley Ellis and Lincoln Chase
 "We Belong Together" contains samples of Bobby Womack's "If You Think You're Lonely Now", written by Bobby Womack, Patrick Moten and Sandra Sully, and The Deele's "Two Occasions", written by Darnell Bristol and Kenneth Edmonds

Charts

Weekly charts

Year-end charts

Certifications and sales

Release history

References

External links 
 

2015 compilation albums
Epic Records compilation albums
Mariah Carey compilation albums
Compilation albums of number-one songs